Torfaen is a constituency in Wales represented in the House of Commons of the UK Parliament since 2015 by Nick Thomas-Symonds, a member of the Labour Party who also serves as the Shadow Secretary of State for International Trade. It was established for the 1983 general election.

Boundaries

The area is traditionally a Labour Party stronghold with a majority of around 9,000. The community of New Inn is the only strong Conservative area. It voted Labour even amidst the huge Conservative majorities of 1983 and 1987. However, 2019 saw the lowest Labour majority in Torfaen in the seat's history, of only 3,742 votes, perhaps due to the constituency registering a strong Leave vote in the 2016 EU membership referendum. The area covers the new town of Cwmbran, Pontypool, and its surrounding districts and stretches as far north as Blaenavon.

Members of Parliament

Elections

Elections in the 1980s

Elections in the 1990s

Elections in the 2000s

Elections in the 2010s

Of the 46 rejected ballots:
26 were either unmarked or it was uncertain who the vote was for.
19 voted for more than one candidate.
1 had writing or mark by which the voter could be identified.

Of the 68 rejected ballots:
47 were either unmarked or it was uncertain who the vote was for.
21 voted for more than one candidate.

Of the 62 rejected ballots:
39 were either unmarked or it was uncertain who the vote was for.
23 voted for more than one candidate.

Of the 126 rejected ballots:
100 were either unmarked or it was uncertain who the vote was for.
26 voted for more than one candidate.

See also
 Torfaen (Senedd constituency)
 List of parliamentary constituencies in Gwent
 List of parliamentary constituencies in Wales

Notes

References

External links 
Politics Resources (Election results from 1922 onwards)
Electoral Calculus (Election results from 1955 onwards)
2017 Election House Of Commons Library 2017 Election report
A Vision Of Britain Through Time (Constituency elector numbers)

Parliamentary constituencies in South Wales
Constituencies of the Parliament of the United Kingdom established in 1983
Torfaen